Pamponerus germanicus is a Palearctic species of robber fly in the family Asilidae.

References

External links
Geller Grim Robberflies of Germany
Images representing Pamponerus germanicus

Asilomorph flies of Europe
Asilidae
Flies described in 1758
Taxa named by Carl Linnaeus